Lake Vaquero is a private lake located two blocks southwest of Topeka, Kansas, and about three blocks northwest of Lake Sherwood (Kansas). It is bounded by Indian Hills Road on the east, El Cerrito Drive on the south, Lagito Drive on the west and SW 29th Street on the north. If filled to the dam's brim, the lake would have a  capacity. It normally has a  capacity.

Lake Vaquero was built in the early 1960s.  It has always been a lake and over the years residences have been built around it.  Today, it is completely surrounded by houses.  Periodically the lake has been dredged, because runoff from nearby construction and fields has resulted in the lake bottom being covered in silt.  In 2010, the lake's owners, represented by the Vaquero Lake Club, faced costly upgrades to the dam to increase the safety of persons and property downstream from it.

Being a private lake, Vaquero Lake Club members enjoy boating, fishing and swimming at the beach on Lake Vaquero.

References

Reservoirs in Kansas
Lakes of Shawnee County, Kansas